Lucius Marcius Censorinus was a Roman Republican consul who served alongside Manius Manilius.
He and Manilius led the Roman legions in an ill-fated two-pronged attack on Carthage, which was eventually repulsed by the army of the Carthaginian Generals Hasdrubal the Boeotarch and Himilco Phameas, during the first stages of the Third Punic War.

Notes 

 

2nd-century BC Roman consuls
Lucius